Myosotella is a European genus or subgenus (of Ovatella) of small, salt marsh snails, terrestrial pulmonate gastropod mollusks in the subfamily Pythiinae of the family Ellobiidae.  

It feeds on algae growing on the rocks in a stream.

Species
Species within the genus Myosotella include:
 † Myosotella bardini (Tournouër, 1872) 
 † Myosotella benoisti (Degrange-Touzin, 1892)
 Myosotella bicolor (Morelet, 1860)
 † Myosotella blesensis (de Morgan, 1917)
 † Myosotella boissyi (Cossmann, 1889)
 † Myosotella depressa (O. Boettger, 1877)
 † Myosotella dumortieri (Fontannes, 1876)
 † Myosotella fusiformis (A. Bell, 1870)
 † Myosotella mucronata (O. Boettger, 1875)
 † Myosotella munieri (Tournouër, 1872)
 Myosotella myosotis Draparnaud, 1801
 † Myosotella myotis (Brocchi, 1814)
 † Myosotella obovata (Paladilhe, 1874)
 † Myosotella polyodon (F. Sandberger, 1872)
 † Myosotella raouli (Ivolas & Peyrot, 1900) 
 † Myosotella torulosa (Paladilhe, 1874)
 † Myosotella viennensis (Fontannes, 1876)
Species brought into synonymy
 Myosotella denticulata (Montagu, 1803): synonym of Myosotella myosotis (Draparnaud, 1801)

References

 Gofas, S.; Le Renard, J.; Bouchet, P. (2001). Mollusca, in: Costello, M.J. et al. (Ed.) (2001). European register of marine species: a check-list of the marine species in Europe and a bibliography of guides to their identification. Collection Patrimoines Naturels, 50: pp. 180–213
 Starobogatov, Ya.I. & Anistratenko, V.V. (1993). Моллюски подотряда Ellobioidei (Pulmonata) побережья Средиземного моря и Ев- ропейской Атлантики. [Molluscs of the suborder Ellobioidei (Pulmonata) of the shores of the Mediterranean and European Atlantic]. Вестник зоологии [Vestnik Zoologii]. (1993)4: 3-9.

External links
 AnimalBase info at: 
 Monterosato, T. A. di. (1906). Articolo sulle Auriculidae, Assiminidae e Truncatellidae dei mari d'Europa. Il Naturalista Siciliano. New Series, 18 (6): 125–130
 Gray, J.E. (1847). On the classification of the British Mollusca by W E Leach. Annals and Magazine of Natural History. ser. 1, 20: 267-273.
  Wenz, W. (1920). Die Ellobiiden des Mainzer Beckens. Senckenbergiana. 2: 189-192
 Brown, T. (1827). Illustrations of the conchology of Great Britain and Ireland. Drawn from nature. W.H. Lizars and D. Lizars, Edinburgh and S. Highley, London. 144 pp., 52 pls
 Pallary, P. (1900). Coquilles marines du littoral du département d'Oran. Journal de Conchyliologie. 48(3): 211-422
 Martins, A. M. de F. (1999). On the generic separation of Ovatella Bivona, 1832 and Myosotella Monterosato (Pulmonata, Ellobiidae). Iberus. 17(2): 59-75†

Ellobiidae
Gastropods

nl:Gewoon muizenoortje